Abagtha was a court official (or a eunuch) of King Ahasuerus.  He is mentioned once in the Book of Esther. According to this narrative, King Ahasuerus commanded Abagtha and six other officials to parade the Queen Vashti before the king and his ministers in the crown jewels. Her refusal led to her demise and the selection of Esther as the new queen of the Persian Empire.

The etymology of the name "Abagtha" is uncertain.

In Esther 1:10, Abagtha is referred as a סָרִיס (sarīs). This Hebrew word, translated eunuch, can mean a general court official, not only a castrated man.  Since Abagtha and the other six officials are spoken of as attending to the king, not to royal women, it is possible that he was not a eunuch in the technical sense.

References 

Hebrew Bible people
Book of Esther